Missbehave was a Brooklyn-based women's magazine that was produced from 2006 until March 2009. It covered fashion, music, art and pop culture. Columnists included Kelis, Matt Goias, Sarah Morrison and Lesley Arfin and regularly featured models Kim Matulova, Victoria Brito, Joli Robinson and Brissi.

Several examples of Missbehave cover stars were:
 Katy Perry (Issue #11 – Spring 2009) 
 Chloë Sevigny (Issue #10 – Winter 2008–2009)
 Santigold (Issue #9 – Fall 2008)
 Barbara Fialho (Issue #8 – Summer 2008)
 Amber Heard (Issue #7 – Spring 2008)
 Lydia Hearst (Issue #6 – Winter 2007–2008)
 M.I.A. (Issue #5 – Fall 2007)
 Mena Suvari (Issue #4 – Summer 2007)
 Bijou Phillips (Issue #3 – Spring 2007)
 Lily Allen (Issue #2 – Winter 2006–2007)
 Nelly Furtado (Issue #1 – Fall 2006)

Staff
Founder: Samantha Moeller
Editor-In-Chief for issues 1–9: Mary H.K. Choi
Editor-In-Chief issues 10–11: Lesley Arfin 
Creative Director: Sally Thurer
Director of Photography: Brooke Nipar
West Coast Editor: Yasi Salek
Senior Editor: Olivia Allin
Features Fashion Editor: Allison Miller
Market Editor: Rose Garcia
Online Editor: Sarah Morrison
Special Projects Coordinator: Emilia Perez
Type Consultant: Jeremy Pettis
Publisher: Adrian Moeller
Interns: Bridget Dean, Stefanie Arroyo, Christine Mayrina, Olivia Kirsch, Alex Harrington, Meghan Calabro, Annie Krasner and Meg Prossnitz

References

External links
 Digital archive of print issues (PDF)
 Missbehave official website (Internet Archive)
 Mass Appeal Marks Decade in Business with Launch of Spinoff
 Articles about Missbehave on Jezebel
 Article about Missbehave in The New York Observer
 Missbehave Names Lesley Arfin Editor-in-Chief
 Missbehave Totally Dunzo

Fashion magazines published in the United States
Quarterly magazines published in the United States
Defunct women's magazines published in the United States
Magazines established in 2006
Magazines disestablished in 2009
Magazines published in New York City
Women's fashion magazines